Ride the Tiger is a 1970 American film starring George Montgomery and directed by Ferde Grofe Jr.. It also starred Victoria Shaw, Marshall Thompson and Colombian American actor Andre Marquis. It also featured notable Hollywood producer Peter MacGregor-Scott, working at that time as the film's production manager in the role of a villain.

Plot
The partner of a slain nightclub owner seeks out an Asian underworld big shot.

Cast
George Montgomery 		
Victoria Shaw 		
Marshall Thompson

Production 
In 1966, Montgomery announced the second of two films he'd make with Ferde Grofé Jr., the first being Warkill. Grofé later said the film would be part of a slate of 12 movies he was making for Balut Productions.

References

External links

1970 films
American action films
1970s English-language films
1970s American films